John Keith Oliver (born 14 April 1935) is a British retired Anglican bishop. He was the 103rd Bishop of Hereford from 1990 to 2003.

Early life and education
Oliver was born on 14 April 1935. He was educated at Westminster and Gonville and Caius College, Cambridge. He has Master of Arts (MA Cantab) and Master of Letters (MLitt) degrees.

Ordained ministry
He was made a deacon at Michaelmas 1964 (20 September) at Cromer Parish Church and ordained a priest the Michaelmas following (19 September 1965) at Norwich Cathedral, both times by Launcelot Fleming, Bishop of Norwich. After a curacy in Norfolk, he spent a period as chaplain and assistant master at Eton College. Following incumbencies in Devon, he became Archdeacon of Sherborne and Rector of West Stafford in Dorset before being consecrated a bishop on 6 December 1990 at Westminster Abbey. He served in the House of Lords from January 1997 until November 2003 with special responsibility for agricultural and environmental policy.  He was succeeded by Anthony Priddis, previously Bishop suffragan of Warwick.

Personal life
He married Meriel Moore in 1961; she died in 2014. They had two sons and one daughter; his daughter died in 2002.

References

1935 births
People educated at Westminster School, London
Alumni of Gonville and Caius College, Cambridge
Archdeacons of Sherborne
Bishops of Hereford
Living people